Mícheál Ó Raghallaigh (sometimes spelled "Mícheál O' Reilly") is an Irish concertina player and recording artist residing in County Meath, Ireland.

He has been a member of the band Providence, along with Paul Doyle (vocals, guitar, and Irish bouzouki), Troy Bannon (Irish flute), Cyril O'Donoghue (vocals, Irish bouzouki, guitar), and Michelle O'Brien (violin). He plays with the Táin & Naomh Pádraig Céilí Bands, and has released two solo albums.

Ó Raghallaigh is the brother of Macdara Ó Raghallaigh, a well-known traditional fiddle player and fellow member of the Naomh Pádraig Céilí Band, along with their sisters Nóra and Áine (also fiddle players). He has also collaborated with Catherine McEvoy and Caoimhín Ó Raghallaigh, as well as accordion player Danny O'Mahony. His most recent recording has been a collaboration with Tim Collins, Pádraig Rynne, Caitlín Nic Gabhann and Edel Fox, entitled ICE (Irish Concertina Ensemble). They released an album in 2015 called Zero.

He has previously taught concertina at the Willie Clancy Summer School, Scoil Éigse at Fleadh Cheoil na hÉireann and at summer music camps throughout the U.S. and Ireland. Finally, he is a distributor of R. Morse & Co. concertinas for the buttonbox.com.

Discography 
 Providence - Providence - 1999
 Michael O'Raghallaigh - The Nervous Man - 2001
 Providence - A Fig For A Kiss - 2001
 Providence - Providence III - 2005
 Michael O'Raghallaigh - Inside Out - 2008
  Catherine McEvoy, Caoimhín Ó'Raghallaigh, Mícheál Ó'Raghallaigh - Comb Your Hair And Curl It - 2010
 Michael Ó'Raghallaigh & Danny O'Mahony - As it Happened - 2012
 Naomh Pádraig Céilí Band: 3 In A Row All Ireland Champions - 2013
 Irish Concertina Ensemble (Tim Collins, Padraig Rynne, Micheal O'Raghallaigh, Caitlin Nic Gabhann and Edel Fox) - Zero - 2015

References

External links 
 O'Raghallaigh's Concertina distribution page at the buttonbox.com
 Comb Your Hair and Curl It on iTunes

Living people
Irish musicians
Year of birth missing (living people)